Mangpor Cholthicha is a famous Thai Luk thung singer and actress.

Early life
Mangpor Cholthicha (12 May 1983) was born into a poor family in Khon Kaen Province. She is the oldest daughter of Kwanchai and Phitsamai Thongdaeng but younger than all her brothers. Her birth name is Pimpatcha Thongdaeng. Since her family was very poor, they had to relocate from her birthplace, to other places such as Chonburi, Nonthaburi and Phra Nakhon Si Ayutthaya. From a young age, she had to help in raising her family.

Entertainers
She began her music career in 1999 when she was a singer with Nopporn Silvergold label and stayed there until 2012. She was also an actress on Channel 7. In 2012, she was a singer with R-Siam label. Currently, she is an independent singer

Discography

Albums
 Sao Sip Hok (สาว 16)
 Noo Kluay Tukkae (หนูกลัวตุ๊กแก)
 Tam Ha Som Chai (ตามหาสมชาย)
 Nang Sao Nanzee (นางสาวแนนซี่)
 Mae Kruay Hua Khai (แม่ครัวหัวไข่)
 Mang Poe Loe Rak (แมงปอล้อรัก)
 Tha Rak (ท้ารัก) (Original is Busaba Athisthan.)
 Jhonny Thee Rak (จอห์นนี่ที่รัก) (Original is Busaba Athisthan.)
 Rued Kha (เริ่ดค่ะ)

Filmography

TV Series
 1999 – Nang Eak Lang Ban (นางเอกหลังบ้าน)
 2000
 Kam Ma Thep Luang (กามเทพลวง)
 Nang Sib Song (นางสิบสอง)
 2001
 Kaew Na Ma (แก้วหน้าม้า)
 Nay Hoi Tha Min (นายฮ้อยทมิฬ)
 Ton Rak (ต้นรัก)
 2010 – Mae Sri Prai (แม่ศรีไพร)

Family life
In 2008, she married Anuiyhad Seesawad, however, they divorced in 2010.

In 2015, she started dating Piyaphong Champafueang, and in 2017 she gave birth to a son. The reason she and her partner did not marry, was because she was saving money to raise her son.

References

External links
  (Mangpoe Cholthicaa Facebook Fanpage)

1983 births
Living people
Mangpor Chonthicha
Mangpor Chonthicha
Mangpor Chonthicha